Melissa Jaffer (born 1 December 1936) is an Australian actress. She is best known for her stage and television roles, but has also appeared in many films.

Career
Jaffer started her career in theatre productions in the mid 1950s has made many appearances in television series, including Kings, Mother and Son, G. P., Brides of Christ, Grass Roots and All Saints. Jaffer is probably best known to international audiences for her role as aging mystic Utu-Noranti Pralatong in the science fiction series Farscape. In 1976, Jaffer tied for the first AACTA Award for Best Actress in a Supporting Role opposite Jacki Weaver for her performance in Caddie. In 1980 she played the part of Cousin Edie in the Australian Broadcasting Corporation's children's television series The Nargun and the Stars.

In the 2015 film Mad Max: Fury Road she played the role of "Keeper of the Seeds".

Filmography

FILM

TELEVISION

References

External links

1936 births
Australian film actresses
People from Gladstone, South Australia
Living people
Australian soap opera actresses
20th-century Australian actresses
Best Supporting Actress AACTA Award winners
21st-century Australian women
21st-century Australian people